Motilal Nehru National Institute of Technology Allahabad (MNNIT or NIT Allahabad), formerly Motilal Nehru Regional Engineering College (MNREC), is one of the 31 National Institutes of Technology, located in Allahabad (Prayagraj), Uttar Pradesh, India. The college has the distinction of being the first in the country to start an undergraduate programme in Computer Science & Engineering, in 1976–77.

History

Motilal Nehru Regional Engineering College was established in 1961. MNREC was started with one branch of engineering – Electrical. The foundation stone was laid by Jawaharlal Nehru, the first Prime Minister of India, and the institute was named after his father, lawyer, and freedom fighter, Motilal Nehru. The founding principal of the college was Gopal Kishore Agrawal. It has great historical importance.

The main building of the college was inaugurated by Prime Minister Lal Bahadur Shastri on 18 April 1965. Effective from 26 June 2002, the college became a deemed university and was renamed Motilal Nehru National Institute of Technology.

From its beginnings, the institute offered bachelor's degree programs in Civil, Electrical, and Mechanical Engineering. The institute was the first in the country to offer an undergraduate program in Computer Science and Engineering, which was started in 1976. In 1982-83 undergraduate programs in Electronics Engineering, and Production and Industrial Engineering were started.

Postgraduate programs were introduced in 1970–71 with master's degree courses in all engineering departments. The institute now offers MTech degree programs, MCA, MSc Mathematics and Scientific Computing courses and registers candidates for PhD degrees. The institute has been recognized by the Government of India as a center for the quality improvement program in Civil and Mechanical Engineering. The institute started a two-year/four semesters postgraduate degree in Management Studies in 1996. The institute added undergraduate programs in Chemical Engineering and BioTechnology in 2006.

The college has been recognized by AICTE as a center for the Quality Improvement Programme. In 1972, the college established an industrial estate with 69 sheds with the objective of encouraging entrepreneurs and creating additional revenue.

The college is a member of the Indo-UK REC project in the area of design. Under this scheme, a Design Center was established at a cost of about Rs. six crores, which offers training and consultancy. It was given the status of an Institute of National Importance (INI) on 15 August 2007.

In 2011, the institute celebrated its Golden Jubilee year.

It is among the few technical institutions in India to house two supercomputers, PARAM 8000 and PARAM 10000.

Academics

Academic programmes

MNNIT offers a four-year undergraduate course in various engineering disciplines. Indian students are admitted through Joint Entrance Exam (JEE Mains), while foreign students or N.R.Is (Non-Resident of India) are admitted through Direct Admission of Students Abroad (DASA).

MNNIT offers 19 post-graduate programs of two-year duration leading to MTech degrees. The Computer Science department offers a Master's in Computer Applications (MCA). It has a master's course in Mathematics and Scientific Computing. Campus has B-school known as the School of Management Studies. Master of Social Work (MSW) is also running in the institute since 2009.

MNNIT also offers a Doctor of Philosophy (PhD) program in Physics, Chemistry, Math's and in many engineering disciplines.

Ranking 

MNNIT has been ranked 42nd among engineering colleges, and 88th in overall ranking by the NIRF in 2021. 
MNNIT was ranked 48th among engineering colleges, and 93rd among overall ranking by the National Institutional Ranking Framework (NIRF) in 2020.

Departments

The departments in the institute are:
Engineering
Biotechnology
Applied Mechanics
Chemical Engineering
Computer Science and Engineering
Civil Engineering
Electrical Engineering
Electronics and Communication Engineering
Information Technology
Production and Industrial Engineering
Mechanical Engineering
Product Design & Development
Science
Chemistry
Mathematics
Physics
Humanities and Social Science
School of Management Studies

Notable alumni
Sanjiv Chaturvedi, IFS officer who has exposed many corruption cases in Haryana and AIIMS; received the Presidential reference a record four times and the Ramon Magsaysay award in 2015.
Deep Joshi, social worker and NGO activist, recipient of the Magsaysay award in 2009
Atul Sobti, the chairman and managing director from January 2016 to June 2019 of Bharat Heavy Electricals Limited (BHEL)
Onkar Singh, Founder Vice Chancellor of Madan Mohan Malaviya University of Technology, Gorakhpur, (U.P.) – India
B. N. Singh, Chairman of ICTACEM, Professor & Dean HR(Human Resource), IIT Kharagpur
Sapan Saxena, Indian author, best known for his novels Finders, Keepers, UNNS-The Captivation & The Tenth Riddle

See also 
 Culrav, an annual cultural festival

References

External links

National Institute of Technology, Allahabad

Engineering colleges in Allahabad
National Institutes of Technology
Educational institutions established in 1961
1961 establishments in Mysore State
All India Council for Technical Education